The third season of Frasier originally aired from September 19, 1995, to May 21, 1996, on NBC, consisting a total of 24 episodes. This season was mostly directed by Philip Charles MacKenzie (17 episodes). It also featured the episode, "Moon Dance", the first episode in the series to be directed by Kelsey Grammer.

Cast

Main
 Kelsey Grammer as Frasier Crane
 Jane Leeves as Daphne Moon
 David Hyde Pierce as Niles Crane
 Peri Gilpin as Roz Doyle
 John Mahoney as Martin Crane

Special guest
Mercedes Ruehl as Kate Costas
Griffin Dunne as Bob
Donald O'Connor as Harlow Stafford
Tony Shalhoub as Manu

Special appearance by
Dan Butler as Bulldog
Shelley Long as Diane Chambers

Recurring
Edward Hibbert as Gil Chesterton

Guest
Patrick Kerr as Noel Shempsky
Trevor Einhorn as Frederick
John Carroll Lynch as Franklin
Harris Yulin as Jerome Belasco
Jane Kaczmarek as Maureen
Denise Poirier as Maggie
Harriet Sansom Harris as Bebe Glazer

Episodes

References

1995 American television seasons
1996 American television seasons
Frasier 03

Reception
The season ranked 12th in the season ratings with an average viewership of 13 million households, making it the 7th highest ranking show on the network.

Cast

Main
 Kelsey Grammer as Frasier Crane
 Jane Leeves as Daphne Moon
 David Hyde Pierce as Niles Crane
 Peri Gilpin as Roz Doyle
 John Mahoney as Martin Crane

Special guest
Mercedes Ruehl as Kate Costas
Griffin Dunne as Bob
Donald O'Connor as Harlow Stafford
Tony Shalhoub as Manu

Special appearance by
Dan Butler as Bulldog
Shelley Long as Diane Chambers

Recurring
Edward Hibbert as Gil Chesterton

Guest
Patrick Kerr as Noel Shempsky
Trevor Einhorn as Frederick
John Carroll Lynch as Franklin
Harris Yulin as Jerome Belasco
Jane Kaczmarek as Maureen
Denise Poirier as Maggie
Harriet Sansom Harris as Bebe Glazer

References

1995 American television seasons
1996 American television seasons
Frasier 03